F1 Magazine is a Syrian monthly computer magazine published in Arabic, which launched in April 2006. F1 Magazine is the first tutorials based Magazine in the Middle East. Its policy concentrates on tutorials, using the How to concept.

Background of the name
Keyboard makers and software companies used a specific keyboard button to refer to the software documentation and help. The key is often F1, hence the name. 

F1 Magazine used this keyboard button to indicate to its policy, which is "trying to help".

F1 Magazine Index

In F1 Magazine, readers can find : 
 Programs
 Internet & Networking
 Hacking & Security
 Handheld Devices
 Programming
 Multimedia
 VIPs in Computers
 Hobbyist Laboratory
 Concepts & Principles
 Games (often features the making of games)
 System maintenance & Technical Support
 Apple Macintosh

F1 Services

In its 4th Issue F1 Magazine announced for the first time for F1 TV, the Official Podcast of F1 TV which was the first Arabian Video Podcast that provides Computer Tutorials.

Each Episode of F1 TV contains : 
 Technology News
 Video Games Trailers
 Computer tips & Tricks

In addition to F1 TV, F1 Magazine launched two additional Free Services which are : 

1- Arabic Font Office : 
Free service allows to write your name using different types of Arabic Font.

2- Google Video Downloader : 
Free service allows to download video files from Google Video in different types : MP4, Flash Video(Flv) and AVI.

External links
F1 Magazine Official Website
F1 Magazine Official Podcast
Arabic Font Office
F1 Mag Google Video Downloader
Review about F1 Magazine (in Arabic)
The Pitstop - F1 Memorabilia

2006 establishments in Syria
Video game magazines
Computer magazines published in Syria
Monthly magazines
Magazines established in 2006
Science and technology in Syria